Novac is the Romanian form of the Slavic Novak and can refer to:

Places 
 Novac, a village in Argetoaia commune, Dolj County, Romania
 Brazda lui Novac, a Roman limes in present-day Romania, known also as Constantine's Wall

People 
 Ana Novac (1929-2010), writer and Holocaust survivor
 Baba Novac (~1530–1601), soldier, considered a national hero by both Serbs and Romanians
 Daniel Novac (born 1987), a Romanian footballer

See also 
 Novak (disambiguation)
 Novaci (disambiguation)